Space rock may refer to:
Space rock, a form or genre of music
Asteroids are sometimes called space rocks
Meteorites are also sometimes called space rocks
"Space Rock" a song by Weezer from their 2002 album Maladroit
 "Space Rock", a song from the French band Rockets from their 1978 album On the Road Again